The Rural Municipality of Rodgers No. 133 is a rural municipality (RM) in the Canadian province of Saskatchewan within Census Division No. 7 and  Division No. 2.

History 
The RM of Rodgers No. 133 incorporated as a rural municipality on December 9, 1912.

Geography 
The western portion of Old Wives Lake is in the southeast corner of the RM.

Demographics 

Government 
The RM of Rodgers No. 133 is governed by an elected municipal council and an appointed administrator that meets on the second Tuesday of every month. The reeve of the RM is Brent Tremblay while its administrator is Charlene Loos. The RM's office is located in Moose Jaw.

References 

Rodgers No. 133, Saskatchewan
Rodgers